Robert Joseph Dole (July 22, 1923 – December 5, 2021) was an American politician and attorney who represented Kansas in the United States Senate from 1969 to 1996. He was the Republican Leader of the Senate during the final 11 years of his tenure, including three non-consecutive years as Senate Majority Leader. Prior to his 27 years in the Senate, he served in the United States House of Representatives from 1961 to 1969. Dole was also the Republican presidential nominee in the 1996 election and the vice presidential nominee in the 1976 election.

Dole was born and raised in Russell, Kansas, where he established a legal career after serving with distinction in the United States Army during World War II. Following a period as Russell County Attorney, he won election to the House of Representatives in 1960. In 1968, Dole was elected to the Senate, where he served as chairman of the Republican National Committee from 1971 to 1973 and chairman of the Senate Finance Committee from 1981 to 1985. He led the Senate Republicans from 1985 to his resignation in 1996, and served as Senate Majority Leader from 1985 to 1987 and from 1995 to 1996. In his role as Republican leader, he helped defeat Democratic President Bill Clinton's health care plan.

President Gerald Ford chose Dole as his running mate in the 1976 election after Vice President Nelson Rockefeller withdrew from seeking a full term. Ford was defeated by Democrat Jimmy Carter in the general election. Dole sought the Republican presidential nomination in 1980, but quickly dropped out of the race. He experienced more success in the 1988 Republican primaries but was defeated by Vice President George H. W. Bush. Dole won the Republican presidential nomination in 1996 and selected Jack Kemp as his running mate. The Republican ticket lost in the general election to Clinton, making Dole the first unsuccessful major party nominee for both president and vice president. He resigned from the Senate during the 1996 campaign and did not seek public office again after the election.

Dole remained active after retiring from public office. He appeared in numerous commercials and television programs and served on various councils. In 2012, Dole unsuccessfully advocated Senate ratification of the Convention on the Rights of Persons with Disabilities. He initially supported Jeb Bush in the 2016 Republican primaries, but later became the only former Republican presidential nominee to endorse Donald Trump in the general election. Dole was a member of the advisory council of the Victims of Communism Memorial Foundation and special counsel at the Washington, D.C., office of law firm Alston & Bird. Dole was awarded the Congressional Gold Medal on January 17, 2018. He was married to former U.S. Senator Elizabeth Dole of North Carolina.

Early life and education
Dole was born on July 22, 1923, in Russell, Kansas, the son of Bina M. (née Talbott; 1904–1983) and Doran Ray Dole (1901–1975). His father, who had moved the family to Russell shortly before Robert was born, earned money by running a small creamery. One of Dole's father's customers was the father of his future Senate colleague Arlen Specter. The Doles lived in a house at 1035 North Maple in Russell and it remained his official residence throughout his political career.

Dole graduated from Russell High School in the spring of 1941 and enrolled at the University of Kansas the following fall. Dole had been a star high school athlete in Russell, and Kansas basketball coach Phog Allen traveled to Russell to recruit him to play for the Jayhawks basketball team. While at KU, Dole was on the basketball team, the track team, and the football team. In football, Dole played at the end position. In 1942 he was a teammate of the founder and longtime owner of the Tennessee Titans Bud Adams, Adams's only season playing football at Kansas. While in college, Dole joined the Kappa Sigma fraternity, and in 1970 he was bestowed with the Fraternity's "Man of the Year" honor. Dole's collegiate studies were interrupted by World War II, when he enlisted in the United States Army.

Dole attended the University of Arizona in Tucson from 1948 to 1949, before transferring to Washburn University in Topeka, where he graduated with both undergraduate and law degrees in 1952.

World War II and recovery
Dole joined the United States Army's Enlisted Reserve Corps in 1942 to fight in World War II, becoming a second lieutenant in the Army's 10th Mountain Division.
In April 1945, while engaged in combat near Castel d'Aiano in the Apennine mountains southwest of Bologna, Italy, Dole was seriously wounded by a German shell that struck his upper back and right arm, shattering his collarbone and part of his spine. "I lay face down in the dirt," Dole said. "I could not see or move my arms. I thought they were missing."
As Lee Sandlin describes, when fellow soldiers saw the extent of his injuries, they believed all they could do was "give him the largest dose of morphine they dared and write an 'M' for 'morphine' on his forehead in his own blood, so that nobody else who found him would give him a second, fatal dose."

Dole was paralyzed from the neck down and transported to a military hospital near Kansas. Having blood clots, a life-threatening infection, and a fever of almost , he was expected to die. After large doses of penicillin were not successful, he overcame the infection with the administration of streptomycin, which at the time was still an experimental drug. He remained despondent, "not ready to accept the fact that my life would be changed forever". He was encouraged to see Hampar Kelikian, an orthopedist in Chicago who had been working with veterans returning from war. Although during their first meeting Kelikian told Dole that he would never be able to recover fully, the encounter changed Dole's outlook on life, who years later wrote of Kelikian, a survivor of the Armenian genocide, "Kelikian inspired me to focus on what I had left and what I could do with it, rather than complaining what had been lost." Dr. K, as Dole later came to affectionately call him, operated on him seven times, free of charge, and had, in Dole's words, "an impact on my life second only to my family".

Dole recovered from his wounds at the Percy Jones Army Hospital in Battle Creek, Michigan. This complex of federal buildings, no longer a hospital, is now named Hart–Dole–Inouye Federal Center in honor of three patients who became United States Senators: Dole, Philip Hart, and Daniel Inouye. Dole was decorated three times, receiving two Purple Hearts for his injuries, and the Bronze Star with "V" Device for valor for his attempt to assist a downed radioman. The injuries left him with limited mobility in his right arm and numbness in his left arm. He minimized the effect in public by keeping a pen in his right hand, and learned to write with his left hand. In 1947, he was medically discharged from the Army as a captain.

Early political career 

Dole ran for office for the first time in 1950 and was elected to the Kansas House of Representatives, serving a two-year term. During his term he served on the following committees: Assessment and Taxation, Gas and Oil, and Military Affairs and Soldiers Compensation. He became the County Attorney of Russell County in 1953. Dole was elected to the United States House of Representatives from Kansas's 6th congressional district in 1960. After his first term, Kansas lost a congressional district, and most of Dole's district was merged with the neighboring 2nd district to form a new 1st district, encompassing much of central and western Kansas. Dole was elected from this merged district in 1962 and was re-elected two more times.

During his tenure in the House, Dole voted in favor of the Civil Rights Acts of 1964 and 1968, and the Voting Rights Act of 1965.

U.S. Senate (1969–1996) 
In 1968, Dole defeated former Kansas Governor William H. Avery for the Republican nomination for the United States Senate to succeed retiring Senator Frank Carlson. He subsequently won the seat in the general election. Dole was re-elected in 1974, 1980, 1986, and 1992, before resigning on June 11, 1996, to focus on his presidential campaign.

While in the Senate, Dole served as chairman of the Republican National Committee from 1971 to 1973, the ranking Republican on the Agriculture Committee from 1975 to 1978, and the chairman of the Finance Committee from 1981 to 1985. In November 1984, Dole was elected Senate Majority Leader, defeating Ted Stevens 28–25, in the fourth round of balloting.

The continuing war in Vietnam was the dominant source of political division on Capitol Hill in the early 1970s; in 1970 Democratic Senator George McGovern of South Dakota took the Senate floor and condemned the deliberative body's role in maintaining the US presence in Vietnam, saying the Senate chamber "reeks of blood", soon followed by freshman Republican senator Dole on the floor, who vociferously attacked McGovern. Dole was appointed chair of the Republican National Committee the next year. Over time in the Senate, Dole was seen by some as having a moderate voting record. During the following years of the 1970s, Dole and McGovern worked together on the Senate Hunger and Human Needs Committee. They partnered to help pass legislation making food stamps and school lunches more accessible, and fraud more difficult. They expanded the school lunch program and helped establish the Special Supplemental Food Program for Women, Infants and Children (WIC), a federal assistance program for low-income pregnant women, breast-feeding women and children under the age of five.

Dole served on congressional agriculture committees throughout the course of his political career, and became the Republican Party's chief spokesman on farm policy and nutrition issues in the Senate. When Ronald Reagan was elected president in 1980, Dole held the chairmanship of the Senate Agriculture Committee's Nutrition Subcommittee and the Senate Finance Committee. Together with McGovern, Dole spearheaded the elimination of the purchase requirement to receive food stamp benefits and the simplification of eligibility requirements.

Facing a reluctant President and Congress as chairman of the Senate Finance Committee in 1982, Dole was the driving force behind a large tax increase, promoting it as a reform measure to collect money owed by tax cheats and under-taxed businesses. In December of that year, The New York Times referred to Dole as changing from "hard-line conservative" to "mainstream Republicanism".  He became Senate Majority leader in 1985 initially serving in that position for two years. Democrats took control of the Senate following the 1986 United States Senate elections, and Dole became Senate Minority Leader for the next eight years.  Dole was a major supporter and advocate of the Americans with Disabilities Act of 1990.  

The Republicans took control of both the Senate and House of Representatives in the 1994 mid-term elections, due to the fallout from President Bill Clinton's policies including his health care plan, and Dole became Senate Majority Leader for the second time. In October 1995, a year before the presidential election, Dole and Speaker of the House Newt Gingrich led the Republican-controlled Congress to pass a spending bill that President Clinton vetoed, leading to the federal government shutdown from 1995 to 1996. On November 13, Republican and Democratic leaders, including Vice President Al Gore, Dick Armey, and Dole, met to try to resolve the budget and were unable to reach an agreement. By January 1996, Dole was more open to compromise to end the shutdown (as he was campaigning for the Republican presidential nomination), but he was opposed by other Republicans who wanted to continue until their demands were met. In particular, Gingrich and Dole had a tense working relationship as they were potential rivals for the 1996 Republican nomination. Clinton aide George Stephanopoulos cited the shutdown as having a role in Clinton's successful re-election campaign. In a January 3, 1996, Briefing Room address, amid the ongoing United States federal government shutdowns of 1995–1996, President Clinton noted Dole as a lawmaker that was "working together in good faith" to reopen the government.

From 1992 to 1996, Dole played a major role in mobilizing support for Bosnia in the Senate, and pressuring the Clinton administration and NATO to resolve the war there.

In 1996, Dole was the first sitting Senate Party Leader to receive his party's nomination for president. He hoped to use his long experience in Senate procedures to maximize publicity from his rare positioning as Senate Majority Leader against an incumbent president but was stymied by Senate Democrats. Dole resigned his seat on June 11, 1996, to focus on the campaign, saying he had "nowhere to go but the White House or home".

Presidential politics 

Dole ran unsuccessfully for vice president on a ticket headed by President Gerald Ford in 1976. Incumbent Vice President Nelson Rockefeller had announced the previous November his retirement from politics, opting against a run for a full term as vice president, and Dole was chosen as Ford's running mate. Dole was known for his sarcastic one-liner comments, often directed against himself, and during the vice presidential debate replied to Walter Mondale concerning the issues of Watergate and the Nixon pardon, "It is an appropriate topic, I guess, but it's not a very good issue any more than the war in Vietnam would be or World War II or World War I or the war in Korea—all Democrat wars, all in this century. I figured up the other day, if we added up the killed and wounded in Democrat wars in this century, it would be about 1.6 million Americans, enough to fill the city of Detroit."

Dole ran for the 1980 Republican presidential nomination, eventually won by Ronald Reagan. Despite Dole's national exposure from the '76 campaign, he finished behind Reagan, George H. W. Bush, and four others in Iowa and New Hampshire, receiving only 2.5% and 0.4% of votes cast in those contests, respectively. Dole ceased campaigning after the New Hampshire results and announced his formal withdrawal from the race on March 15, instead being re-elected to his third term as Senator that year.

Dole made another attempt for the Republican presidential nomination in 1988, formally announcing his candidacy in his hometown of Russell, Kansas, on November 9, 1987. At the ceremony, Dole was presented by the VFW with a cigar box, similar to the one he had used to collect donations for his war-related medical expenses, containing more than $7,000 in campaign donations. Dole started out strongly by defeating Vice President George H. W. Bush in the Iowa caucus—Bush finished third, behind television evangelist Pat Robertson.

Bush defeated Dole in the New Hampshire primary a week later. After the returns had come in on the night of that primary, Dole appeared to lose his temper in a television interview with Tom Brokaw, saying Bush should "stop lying about my record", in response to a Bush commercial which accused Dole of "straddling" on taxes.

Despite a key endorsement by Senator Strom Thurmond, Dole was defeated by Bush again in South Carolina in early March. Several days later, every southern state voted for Bush in a Super Tuesday sweep. This was followed by another loss in Illinois, which persuaded Dole to withdraw from the race.

1996 presidential campaign 

Despite the 1994 elections, President Clinton's popularity soared due to a booming economy and public opinion polls supporting him in the 1995 budget shutdown. As a result, Clinton and Vice President Al Gore faced no serious opposition in the Democratic primaries. A few months before his death in April 1994, Richard Nixon warned Dole, "If the economy's good, you're not going to beat Clinton." Dole was the early front runner for the GOP nomination in the 1996 presidential race. At least eight candidates ran for the nomination. Dole was expected to win the nomination against underdog candidates such as the more conservative Senator Phil Gramm of Texas and more moderate Senator Arlen Specter of Pennsylvania. Pat Buchanan upset Dole in the early New Hampshire primary, however, with Dole finishing second and former Tennessee governor Lamar Alexander finishing third. Speechwriter Kerry Tymchuk observed, "Dole was on the ropes because he wasn't conservative enough."

Dole eventually won the nomination, becoming the oldest first-time presidential nominee at the age of 73 years, 1 month (President Ronald Reagan was 73 years, 6 months in 1984, for his second presidential nomination). If elected, he would have become the oldest president to take office and the first Kansas native to become president (as Dwight Eisenhower was born in Texas). Dole found the initial draft of the nomination acceptance speech written by Mark Helprin too hardline, so Kerry Tymchuk, who was part of the "'Let Dole be Dole' crowd", revised the speech to cover the themes of honor, decency, and straight talk. It included the following line, a gibe at the all-or-nothing rookie Republicans who had ridden the 1994 midterm GOP wave into Congress: "In politics honorable compromise is no sin. It is what protects us from absolutism and intolerance"'.

In his acceptance speech, Dole stated, "Let me be the bridge to an America that only the unknowing call myth. Let me be the bridge to a time of tranquility, faith, and confidence in action," to which incumbent president Bill Clinton responded, "We do not need to build a bridge to the past, we need to build a bridge to the future."

As told in the Doles' joint biography, Unlimited Partners, speechwriter and biographer Kerry Tymchuk wrote "that he was going to make a statement. He was going to risk it all for the White House. He knew his time as leader was over. It would have been tough to come back [to the Senate as leader] if he lost in November. He knew it was time to move up or move out."

Dole promised a 15% across-the-board reduction in income tax rates and made former Representative and supply side advocate Jack Kemp his running mate for vice president. Dole found himself criticized from both the left and the right within the Republican Party over the convention platform, one of the major issues being the inclusion of the Human Life Amendment. Clinton framed the narrative against Dole early, painting him as a mere clone of unpopular then-House Speaker Newt Gingrich, warning America that Dole would work in concert with the Republican Congress to slash popular social programs, like Medicare and Social Security, dubbed by Clinton as "Dole-Gingrich". Dole's tax-cut plan found itself under attack from the White House, who said it would "blow a hole in the deficit".

During the infancy of the Internet, Dole-Kemp was the first presidential campaign to have a website, which was set up by Arizona State college students Rob Kubasko and Vince Salvato, and edged out Clinton-Gore. The Dole-Kemp presidential campaign page is still live as of 2021.

Concerns over Dole's age and lagging campaign were exemplified by an incident on September 18, 1996. At a rally in Chico, California, he was reaching down to shake the hand of a supporter, when the railing on the stage gave way and he tumbled four feet. While only slightly injured in the fall, "the televised image of his painful grimace underscored the age difference between him and Clinton" and proved an ominous sign for Republican hopes of retaking the White House.

During the latter half of October 1996, Dole made a campaign appearance with Heather Whitestone, the first deaf Miss America, where both of them signed "I love you" to the crowd. Around that time, Dole and his advisers knew that they would lose the election, but in the last four days of the campaign they went on the "96-hour victory tour" to help Republican House candidates.

Dole lost, as pundits had long expected, to incumbent President Bill Clinton in the 1996 election. Clinton won in a 379–159 Electoral College landslide, capturing 49.2% of the vote against Dole's 40.7% and Ross Perot's 8.4%. As Nixon had predicted, Clinton was able to ride a booming economy to a second term in the White House.

Dole is the last World War II veteran to have been the presidential nominee of a major party.  During the campaign, Dole's advanced age was brought up, with critics stating that he was too old to be president.

In his election night concession speech, Dole remarked "I was thinking on the way down in the elevator – tomorrow will be the first time in my life I don't have anything to do." Dole later wrote "I was wrong. Seventy-two hours after conceding the election, I was swapping wisecracks with David Letterman on his late-night show." During the immediate aftermath of his 1996 loss to Clinton, Dole recalled that his critics thought that "I didn't loosen up enough, I didn't show enough leg. They said I was too serious . . . It takes several months to stop fretting about it and move on. But I did." Dole remarked that his decisive defeat to Clinton made it easier for him to be "magnanimous". On his decision to leave politics for good after the 1996 presidential election campaign, despite his guaranteed stature as a former Senate leader, Dole stated, "People were urging [me] to be a hatchet man against Clinton for the next four years. I couldn't see the point. Maybe after all those partisan fights, you look for more friendships. One of the nice things I've discovered is that when you're out of politics, you have more credibility with the other side . . . And you're out among all kinds of people, and that just doesn't happen often for an ex-president; he doesn't have the same freedom. So it hasn't been all bad."

Post-political career 

The 1996 presidential election, despite ending in a loss, opened up numerous opportunities for Dole owing in part to his sense of humor. He engaged in a career of writing, consulting, public speaking, and television appearances. Dole was the first defeated presidential nominee to become a political celebrity.

Television appearances

In November 1996, Dole appeared on Late Show with David Letterman and also made a cameo appearance on Saturday Night Live, parodying himself (shortly after losing the presidential election).  He guest-starred as himself on NBC's Brooke Shields sitcom Suddenly Susan in January 1997.

Dole became a television commercial spokesman for such products as Viagra, Visa, Dunkin' Donuts, and Pepsi-Cola (with Britney Spears).  He was an occasional political commentator on the interview program Larry King Live, and was a guest a number of times on Comedy Central's satirical news program, The Daily Show with Jon Stewart. Dole was, for a short time in 2003, a commentator opposite Bill Clinton on CBS's 60 Minutes.

Employment

After leaving office, Dole joined the Washington, D.C. firm Verner, Liipfert, Bernhard, McPherson and Hand, where he was a registered lobbyist on behalf of foreign governments (including those of Kosovo, Taiwan, and Slovenia); the American Society of Anesthesiologists; Tyco; and the Chocolate Industry Coalition. In 2003, after Verner, Liipfert was acquired by Piper Rudnick, Dole joined the Washington, D.C. law and lobbying firm Alston & Bird LLP, where he continued his lobbying career. While working for Alston & Bird, Dole was registered as a foreign agent in order to represent the government of Taiwan in Washington.

Dole was head of the Federal City Council, a group of business, civic, education, and other leaders interested in economic development in Washington, D.C., from 1998 to 2002.

Voluntary work

Dole was also involved in many volunteer activities.  He served as national chairman of the World War II Memorial Campaign, which raised funds for the building of the National World War II Memorial.  After being built, he visited the memorial on a weekly basis for many years to greet visitors and remember those who served.

Dole also teamed up with his former political rival, Bill Clinton, in 2001 on the Families of Freedom Foundation, a scholarship fund campaign to pay for the college educations for the families of 9/11 victims.  It helped raise more than $100 million.

The Robert J. Dole Institute of Politics, housed on the University of Kansas campus in Lawrence, Kansas, was established to bring bipartisanship back to politics. The institute, which opened in July 2003 to coincide with Dole's 80th birthday, has featured such notable speakers as former President Bill Clinton, and awarded the inaugural Dole Leadership Prize to Rudy Giuliani for his leadership as the Mayor of New York City during the September 11 attacks in 2001.

Dole's legacy also includes a commitment to combating hunger, both in the United States and around the globe. In addition to numerous domestic programs, and along with former Senator George McGovern (D-South Dakota), Dole created an international school lunch program through the George McGovern-Robert Dole International Food for Education and Child Nutrition Program, which, funded largely through the Congress, helps fight child hunger and poverty by providing nutritious meals to children in schools in developing countries. This internationally popular program would go on to provide more than 22 million meals to children in 41 countries in its first eight years.  It has since led to greatly increased global interest in and support for school-feeding programs—which benefit girls and young women, in particular—and won McGovern and Dole the 2008 World Food Prize.

Dole offered the inaugural lecture to dedicate the University of Arkansas Clinton School of Public Service on September 18, 2004. During the lecture, he chronicled his life as a public servant and discussed the importance of public service related to defense, civil rights, the economy and daily life. Dole also gave the 2008 Vance Distinguished Lecture at Central Connecticut State University.

Author

Dole wrote several books, including one on jokes told by the presidents of the United States, in which he ranks the presidents according to their level of humor. Dole released his autobiography, One Soldier's Story: A Memoir, on April 12, 2005. The book chronicles his World War II experiences and his battle to survive his war injuries.

Political activities
After the Clinton–Lewinsky scandal broke in 1998, Dole urged his party to practice "restraint" in their reaction to the scandal. After the resulting late-1998 impeachment of President Clinton, Dole proposed that, instead of holding an impeachment trial, the Senate instead censure Clinton and then have Clinton sign the censure himself in the presence of congressional leaders, the Vice President, Cabinet members, and the justices of the Supreme Court. Some Democratic Senate came to support the notion of having a censure motion instead of holding an impeachment trial. However, the Senate instead held an impeachment trial in which Clinton was acquitted.

President George W. Bush appointed Dole and Donna Shalala, former Secretary of Health and Human Services, as co-chairs of the commission to investigate problems at Walter Reed Army Medical Center in 2007. That same year, Dole joined fellow former Senate majority leaders Howard Baker, Tom Daschle, and George Mitchell to found the Bipartisan Policy Center, a non-profit think-tank that works to develop policies suitable for bipartisan support. Dole also served as a director for the Asia Universal Bank, a bank domiciled in Kyrgyzstan during the discredited Kurmanbek Bakiyev presidential regime which was subsequently shut down owing to its involvement in money laundering.

Dole issued a letter critical of Newt Gingrich, focusing on Dole and Gingrich's time working together on Capitol Hill, on January 26, 2012.  The letter was issued immediately before the Florida primary. Dole endorsed Mitt Romney for the Republican nomination. Dole cited the association made between himself and Gingrich as fellow Congressional leaders in Democratic advertisements as a key factor for his 1996 presidential defeat.

Dole appeared on the Senate floor to advocate ratification of the Convention on the Rights of Persons with Disabilities on December 4, 2012. Democratic Senator John Kerry explained: "Bob Dole is here because he wants to know that other countries will come to treat the disabled as we do." The Senate rejected the treaty by a vote of 61–38, less than the 66 required for ratification. Many Republican senators voted against the bill, fearing it would interfere with American sovereignty. Dole began a reunion tour of his home state of Kansas in early 2014, seeking to visit each of the state's 105 counties. At each stop he spent approximately an hour speaking with old friends and well-wishers. Dole endorsed and campaigned for incumbent Kansas Senator Pat Roberts during the latter's 2014 re-election bid.

In 2015, Dole endorsed former Florida governor Jeb Bush in his presidential campaign. After Bush ended his campaign following the South Carolina primary, Dole endorsed Florida senator Marco Rubio's campaign. During the campaign, Dole criticized Texas senator Ted Cruz, stating that he "question[ed] his allegiance to the party" and that there would be "wholesale losses" if he were to win the Republican nomination. Dole endorsed Donald Trump after the latter clinched the Republican nomination, while all other then-living Republican presidential nominees, George H. W. Bush, George W. Bush, John McCain, and Mitt Romney refused to do so, and became the lone former nominee to attend the 2016 Republican National Convention. Dole had attended every GOP convention since 1964, and did not consider skipping the 2016 edition even though Trump's politics were closer to that of Dole's 1996 primary rival Pat Buchanan.

Former Dole advisers, including Paul Manafort, played a major role in Trump's presidential campaign. Following Trump's electoral victory, Dole coordinated with the Trump campaign and presidential transition team to set up a series of meetings between Trump's staff and Taiwanese officials as well as assisting in successful efforts to include favorable language towards Taiwan in the 2016 Republican Party platform. In February 2016 Dole donated $20,000 to help pay for a camp for children with cancer in central Kansas.

Dole was awarded the Congressional Gold Medal for his service to the nation as a "soldier, legislator and statesman" in January 2018. Despite being immobile, Dole signaled to an aide to assist him in standing for the U.S. national anthem prior to the ceremony.

Dole, at age 95 and in a wheelchair, stood up with the help of an aide at the funeral of George H. W. Bush in the United States Capitol rotunda on December 4, 2018, and saluted to pay his respects to the late president and fellow World War II veteran.

Dole expressed concern the Commission on Presidential Debates were biased against President Trump and his reelection campaign in a public statement on October 9, 2020, saying how he knew all the Republicans on the commission and feared that "none of them support[ed]" the president.

While he endorsed Trump in both 2016 and 2020, in an interview with USA Today conducted for his 98th birthday, Dole said he was "Trumped out", and that Trump had lost the 2020 election despite his attempts to overturn the 2020 U.S. presidential election. He further stated, "He lost the election, and I regret that he did, but they did", adding that Trump "had Rudy Giuliani running all over the country, claiming fraud. He never had one bit of fraud in all those lawsuits he filed and statements he made." At one point during the conversation Dole said, "I'm a Trumper", and added at another, "I'm sort of Trumped out, though."

Awards
Dole was presented with the Presidential Citizens Medal by President Ronald Reagan on January 18, 1989.

Senator Dole was presented the Presidential Medal of Freedom by President Bill Clinton on January 17, 1997, for service to his country in the military and in his political career. In his acceptance remarks in the East Room of the White House, Dole remarked "I had a dream that I would be here this historic week receiving something from the president — but I thought it would be the front-door key".

Dole received the U.S. Senator John Heinz Award for Greatest Public Service by an Elected or Appointed Official, an award given out annually by Jefferson Awards, in 1997.

Dole received the American Patriot Award from the National Defense University in 2004 for his lifelong dedication to the United States and his service in World War II.

On September 30, 2015, the National Commemoration of the Armenian Genocide Centennial (NCAGC) honored Senator Dole with the organization's Survivor's Gratitude Award in the category of "Hero of Responsibility and Principle" for his tireless efforts in raising attention to the Armenian Genocide and its victims.

For his lobbying efforts on behalf of Kosovo Albanians before, during, and after the Kosovo War, Albanian President Bujar Nishani awarded Dole Albania's highest civilian honor, the National Flag Order medal, at a May 2017 ceremony in Washington, D.C.

Dole was awarded the Congressional Gold Medal for his service to the nation as a "soldier, legislator and statesman" on January 17, 2018.

The U.S. Congress unanimously passed a bill promoting the 95-year-old Dole from captain to colonel for his service during World War II in 2019. "I've had a great life and this is sort of icing on the cake. It's not that I have to be a colonel; I was happy being a captain and it pays the same," Dole said, jokingly.

Personal life

Dole married Phyllis Holden, an occupational therapist at a veterans hospital, in Battle Creek, Michigan, in 1948, three months after they met. Their daughter, Robin, was born on October 15, 1954. Dole and Holden divorced January 11, 1972. Holden died on April 22, 2008.

Dole met his second wife, Elizabeth Halford, in 1972. The couple was married on December 6, 1975. They had no children.

Dole was a Freemason and a member of Russell Lodge No. 177, Russell, Kansas. In 1975, Dole was elevated to the 33rd degree of the Scottish Rite.

Dole often referred to himself in the third person in conversation. In a 1996 appearance on Saturday Night Live, he jokingly refuted the habit to Norm Macdonald, saying: "That's not something Bob Dole does. That's not something Bob Dole has ever done, or that Bob Dole will ever do." He had no relation to the Dole Food Company or its namesake James Dole, although confusion between the two did lead Burhanettin Ozfatura, the mayor of İzmir, Turkey, to ban the sale of Dole bananas in the city in February 1995.

Health
Dole had surgery for prostate cancer in 1991. He later spoke before Congress and on public service announcements about early detection of the disease and the erectile dysfunction that resulted from his surgery. He then became a paid spokesman for Viagra. He also starred in a parody of his Viagra commercials for "the little blue can" of Pepsi.

In 2001, Dole, at age 77, was treated successfully for an abdominal aortic aneurysm by vascular surgeon Kenneth Ouriel, who said Dole "maintained his sense of humor throughout his care".

Dole underwent a hip replacement operation that required him to receive blood thinners in December 2004. One month after the surgery, doctors determined that he was bleeding inside his head. He spent 40 days at Walter Reed Army Medical Center; upon his release, his stronger left arm was of limited use. Dole told a reporter that he needed help to handle the simplest of tasks, since both of his arms were of limited use. He continued to go to Walter Reed several times a week for occupational therapy for his left shoulder.

In 2009, Dole was hospitalized for an elevated heart rate and sore legs for which he underwent a successful skin graft procedure. He was hospitalized with pneumonia in February 2010 after undergoing knee surgery. Dole spent ten months at Walter Reed Army Medical Center recovering from the surgery and experienced three bouts with pneumonia. He was released from the hospital in November 2010. Dole was readmitted to Walter Reed Army Medical Center in January 2011 and spent about six days there being treated for a fever and a minor infection.

Dole was hospitalized in November 2012 at Walter Reed National Military Medical Center, according to then-Senate Majority Leader Harry Reid.
Dole was hospitalized at Walter Reed National Military Medical Center for low blood pressure on September 13, 2017. He stayed for 24 hours before returning home.

Death and funeral
In February 2021, Dole announced that he had been diagnosed with stage four lung cancer, and subsequently underwent immunotherapy, forgoing chemotherapy due to its negative effect on his body. He died of complications from the disease in his sleep at his home in Washington, D.C., on the morning of December 5, 2021, at the age of 98.

Numerous politicians paid tribute to Dole after his death, including, President Joe Biden and former presidents Jimmy Carter, Bill Clinton, George W. Bush, Barack Obama and Donald Trump. President Biden issued an order for flags to be flown at half-staff through December 11, 2021, with House Speaker Nancy Pelosi and Senate Majority Leader Chuck Schumer announcing that Dole would lay in state at the U.S. Capitol on December 9.

A funeral service was held at Washington National Cathedral on December 10 and was attended by President Biden with first lady Jill Biden, Vice President Kamala Harris with her husband, second gentleman Doug Emhoff, former president Bill Clinton, former vice presidents Mike Pence, Dick Cheney and Dan Quayle, Senate Minority Leader Mitch McConnell, and former senators Pat Roberts and Tom Daschle, among others.  Later that same day, a memorial ceremony was held at the National World War II Memorial where Chairman of the Joint Chiefs of Staff General Mark A. Milley, actor Tom Hanks and Today Show co-anchor Savannah Guthrie were among those who spoke.  

Dole's casket then returned to Kansas where a memorial service was held at the Catholic Church in his boyhood home of Russell, Kansas, on December 11. The service was open to the public. Speakers included Kansas Governor Laura Kelly, Senators Jerry Moran and Roger Marshall and former Senator Pat Roberts. His casket then went to lie in repose at the Kansas Statehouse. Following that, the casket returned to Washington and he was interred at Arlington National Cemetery.

Electoral history

Books 

   The book was first released during Bob Dole's 1988 presidential run. Re-released as Unlimited Partners: Our American Story. Simon & Schuster, 1996. .

Honorary degrees
Dole was awarded several honorary degrees. These include:

See also
 Kemp Commission
 List of Freemasons
 List of members of the American Legion
 List of people from Kansas

Citations

General and cited references

Further reading

 Abrams, Herbert L., and Richard Brody. "Bob Dole's age and health in the 1996 election: Did the media let us down?." Political Science Quarterly 113.3 (1998): 471-491 online.
 
 
 
 
 Immelman, Aubrey. "The political personalities of 1996 U.S. presidential candidates Bill Clinton and Bob Dole." Leadership Quarterly 9.3 (1998): 335–366. online
 Karčić, Hamza. "Saving Bosnia on Capitol Hill: the case of Senator Bob Dole." Journal of Transatlantic Studies 13.1 (2015): 20–39.
 
 

 Film
 Bob Dole discussing Lee Atwater in the film Boogie Man: The Lee Atwater Story

External links
 
 Bob Dole's remarks at the dedication of the Dole Institute of Politics at the University of Kansas
 Bob Dole's 1996 campaign website
 The Robert J. Dole Institute of Politics
 Bob Dole's biography on Alston & Bird's website
 CNN AllPolitics review of Bob Dole's early life
 
 

 
1923 births
2021 deaths
20th-century American politicians
21st-century American memoirists
1976 United States vice-presidential candidates
American Freemasons
American United Methodists
American lobbyists
American men's basketball players
American politicians with disabilities
American prosecutors
Bipartisan Policy Center
Burials at Arlington National Cemetery
Candidates in the 1980 United States presidential election
Candidates in the 1988 United States presidential election
Candidates in the 1996 United States presidential election
Congressional Gold Medal recipients
Deaths from cancer in Washington, D.C.
Deaths from lung cancer
District attorneys in Kansas
Illeists
Kansas Jayhawks football players
Kansas Jayhawks men's basketball players
Kansas lawyers
Republican Party members of the Kansas House of Representatives
Military personnel from Kansas
People from Russell, Kansas
Politicians with paraplegia
Presidential Citizens Medal recipients
Presidential Medal of Freedom recipients
Protestants from Kansas
Republican National Committee chairs
Republican Party (United States) presidential nominees
Republican Party (United States) vice presidential nominees
Republican Party United States senators from Kansas
Republican Party members of the United States House of Representatives from Kansas
Spouses of North Carolina politicians
United States Army colonels
United States Army personnel of World War II
Washburn University School of Law alumni
Wheelchair users
Writers from Kansas
Members of Congress who became lobbyists